The Luit Academy Junior College is an AHSEC-affiliated institution in Dhamdhama, Assam, India. It was founded in 2007 to provide higher education to economically challenged people in its area, especially those belonging to Scheduled Castes and Tribes.

References

External links
 
 Hirak Das website

Education in Nalbari district
2007 establishments in Assam
Educational institutions established in 2007